The 2012–13 Premier League of Bosnia and Herzegovina, also known as BH Telecom Premier League for sponsorship reasons, was the thirteenth season of the Premier League of Bosnia and Herzegovina, the highest football league of Bosnia and Herzegovina, since its original establishment in 2000 and eleventh as a unified country-wide league. The season began on 4 August 2012 and ended on 26 May 2013, with a winter break between 26 November 2012 and 2 March 2013. The official fixture schedule was released on 3 July 2012.

Željezničar was able to defend the title this season, as they were the defending champions of the last season, having won their eighth domestic league title this season with two rounds left playing. A total of 16 teams contested the league, including 14 sides from the 2011–12 season and one promoted club from each of the two-second-level leagues, Gradina from 2011–12 First League of the Federation of Bosnia and Herzegovina and Radnik from 2011–12 First League of the Republika Srpska who replace relegated Sloboda and Kozara.

Teams
A total of 16 teams contested the league, including 14 sides from the 2011–12 season and two promoted from each of the second-level league, 2011–12 First League of the Federation of Bosnia and Herzegovina and 2011–12 First League of the Republika Srpska.

While relegation of Kozara was confirmed couple of rounds before the end of the last season, Sloboda were relegated only after all the result of the last round were known. Kozara returned to First League of the Republika Srpska after only one season in top flight, while Sloboda were relegated for the first time after 43 years in the highest tier, including also as part of Yugoslav First League.

The relegated teams were replaced by the champions of the two-second–level leagues, Gradina from the First League of the Federation of Bosnia and Herzegovina and Radnik from the First League of the Republika Srpska. Radnik returned to the top flight after spending five years in lower tier, while Gradina made their debut in the Premier League.

Stadiums and locations

1 Čelik has played in round 2 and 4 on Kamberović polje due to works on the pitch of Bilino Polje, which included installing of a new drainage and under-soil heating, as well as the replacement of the turf, sound system and bench for the reserve players. They returned to Bilino Polje on round 6 against Borac.
2 Gradina played their home matches in the first half of the season on Banja Ilidža and NC Goal (only round 6 and 8) due to their own stadium Gradski Stadion, Srebrenik not fulfilling the necessary requirements, but for the second half of the season their stadium got a conditional license to host Premier League matches.
3 Olimpic decided to play its home games in the second half of the season in Tuzla on Tušanj stadium instead of Otoka stadium which they used in the first half of the season but in the end played only one game on it (round 17). Already the next home game (round 20) they returned to their regular home stadium – Otoka stadium.

Personnel and kits

Note: Flags indicate national team as has been defined under FIFA eligibility rules. Players may hold more than one non-FIFA nationality.

Managerial changes

Season events

Sponsorship of the league
On 31 July 2012, an agreement between Football Federation of Bosnia and Herzegovina and BH Telecom was reached regarding sponsorship of the league. The contract worth about 2 million KM was signed on two years, officially renaming the league to BH Telecom Premier League. At first, two clubs, Željezničar and Široki Brijeg, didn't want to agree on the terms of the sponsorship contract because it, as they say, was humiliating for their clubs and that not all clubs in the league can be treated the same way regarding sponsorship. In the end, with few adjustments for those two clubs, the contract was officially signed.

Ban on away fans lifted
On 31 July 2012, the ban on organized attendance of away fans has been lifted. The ban was on power since 8 October 2011 after a couple of incidents, all done by Ultras groups. Also, if one club will have their supporters on an away game they must inform the other club and the football federation 4 days prior to the match.

Ban on away fans conditionally reactivated
After, once again, ultras groups made serious incidents, including derogatory chanting and attempted attack on away fans on match of round 2 between Željezničar and Borac on Grbavica stadium, the same in round 5 between once again Željezničar and this time Slavija, demolishing a pub by The Maniacs, ultras supporters of Željezničar, who arrived in Herzegovina without announcement to the local police in Mostar. The pub was a gathering point of Ultras Zrinjski, ultras group supporting HŠK Zrinjski Mostar and this happened before a match in round 6 between Zrinjski and Željezničar. In an act of revenge, some of Ultras Zrinjski demolished a pub in another part of the city where they thought The Maniacs were. Also, on the same day, after returning from an away match of round 6 between Čelik and Borac, Lešinari, ultras group supporting Borac, demolished two train wagons, while the next day someone burned down a van in which about 12 supporters of Slavija, so-called Sokolovi, were returning from an away match of round 6 between GOŠK and Slavija (only the driver was slightly injured). After all this, the Football Federation of Bosnia and Herzegovina decided to bring up a conditional ban on away fans which will be activated after any serious incident on or before a football match of the Premier League of Bosnia and Herzegovina or in the Bosnia and Herzegovina Football Cup. Overall, in the first five round of the league the disciplinary commission of Football Federation of Bosnia and Herzegovina distributed penalties in the amount of almost €32000.

League table

Positions by round

Results

Clubs season-progress

Season statistics

Transfers

For the list of transfers involving First League clubs during 2012–13 season, please see: List of Bosnia and Herzegovina football transfers summer 2012 and List of Bosnia and Herzegovina football transfers winter 2012–13.

Top goalscorers

* Italic highlights the former club, while bold the current one.

Top assists

* Italic highlights the former club, while bold the current one.

Hat-tricks

4 Player scored 4 goals
5 Player scored 5 goals

Clean sheets

Most Clean Sheets: 17
Sarajevo
Fewest clean sheets: 3
Gradina

Notes
1Without matches played without spectators because of a suspension of a stadium by Football Federation of Bosnia and Herzegovina.

See also
2012–13 Bosnia and Herzegovina Football Cup

References

External links

facebook
Soccerway
SportSport
worldfootball

Premier League of Bosnia and Herzegovina seasons
1
Bosnia